is a Japanese former figure skater. She is the 2010 Golden Spin of Zagreb silver medalist, 2011 NRW Trophy bronze medalist, and a two-time Japanese junior national silver medalist.

Programs

Competitive highlights
JGP: Junior Grand Prix

References

External links 
 
 Japan Skating Federation official results & data site

Japanese female single skaters
1995 births
Living people
People from Okayama Prefecture